The Zookeeper's Wife is a 2017 American war drama film directed by Niki Caro, written by Angela Workman and based on Diane Ackerman's non-fiction book of the same name. The film tells the true story of how Jan and Antonina Żabiński rescued hundreds of Polish Jews from the Germans by hiding them in their Warsaw zoo during World War II. It stars Jessica Chastain, Johan Heldenbergh, Daniel Brühl and Michael McElhatton.

The film had its world premiere on 8 March 2017 in Warsaw, Poland, the location of the story, followed by its US premiere at the Cinequest Film Festival in San Jose, California, on 12 March 2017. The film was released in the United States on 31 March 2017, by Focus Features, and by Universal Pictures International in the United Kingdom on 21 April 2017. It received mixed reviews from critics but a positive response from audiences and grossed $26 million worldwide.

Plot
Dr. Jan Żabiński is director of the Warsaw Zoo, one of the largest in 1930s Europe, assisted by his wife, Antonina.

On 1 September 1939, the aerial bombardment of Warsaw and Invasion of Poland commences. Antonina and her son Ryszard barely survive. Dr. Lutz Heck, head of the Berlin Zoo and Adolf Hitler's chief zoologist and Jan's professional rival, visits the zoo while Jan is away; as Hitler's chief zoologist he's to run the Warsaw Zoo. Offering to house their prized animals in Berlin until after the war, he then returns with soldiers to shoot the others, revealing his hidden brutality. He becomes infatuated with Antonina.

Warsaw Jews are forced into the Ghetto. The Żabińskis' Jewish friends, Maurycy Fraenkel and his partner Magda Gross, seek a safe place for their friend Szymon Tenenbaum's insect collection. Antonina then offers to shelter Magda. Despite the risk, Jan and Antonina use the zoo to hide others and save more lives.

They propose Heck turn the abandoned zoo into a pig farm, to feed the occupying forces, secretly hoping to sneak people out of the Ghetto. Heck, wanting a new site for his experiments in recreating aurochs as a symbol of the Reich, agrees.

When Jan collects garbage inside the Ghetto, he also hides people in the trucks, to bring them to the zoo, working with the Underground Army to later transport them to safehouses throughout the country. Jews are hidden in the zoo's cages, tunnels, and inside the Żabińskis’ house. When Antonina plays the piano late at night, it means it is safe to come out of hiding. But if it is played in the daytime, they must hide. Jan also rescues a young girl, Urszula, who was raped by German soldiers. Antonina takes a particular interest in her, treating her the same way she would treat a frightened animal, until she emerges to join other "guests" in the Zabinskis' home.

In 1942, Germans begin transporting Jews to death camps. At a loading station, Jan tries to convince Janusz Korczak, head of the Jewish children's orphanage, to escape with him, but he will not leave the children. Jan has no choice but to help load children into the cattle cars bound for the death camps. Becoming aware of Heck's obvious feelings for his wife, a rift begins to form between the couple.

In 1943, two women rescued by Jan and disguised as Aryans by Antonina are discovered and executed outside their boarding house. Several months later, after the failed uprising, Germans liquidate the Ghetto on Hitler's birthday, also the first night of Passover. While hidden Jews mournfully celebrate a secret Passover Seder, the Germans burn down the Ghetto.

Jan decides to join the Warsaw Uprising, and the couple reconciles before he leaves. Antonina later gives birth to a baby girl, Teresa. During the uprising, Jan is shot and captured, presumed dead. As Heck's attraction to Antonina intensifies, she struggles to fend him off while guarding the secret "guests." Visiting the house unexpectedly, Heck finds Ryzard, questioning the boy about his parents' whereabouts, but is unable to get any information. In growing suspicion and rage, Heck pins the Nazi cross onto the boy's shirt, goading him to say "Heil Hitler." As he leaves, Ryszard cries out "Hitler is kaput!"

In January 1945, as Soviet troops force the Germans to retreat, evacuation of Warsaw begins. Desperate to know of Jan, Antonina seeks Heck's help. When he asks what he will get in return, she begins to undress, though she obviously can't bear him. Increasingly sure of her deceit, Heck almost rapes her, she finally confesses that he disgusts her, and he begins to realize how much she has lied. Calling for his car to go to the zoo, Antonina races home and helps her guests escape, just as Heck arrives. Magda takes baby Teresa with her, but Ryszard insists on staying, so Antonina hides him.

Heck enters the house in fury, discovering the basement drawings: Stars of David, dates, and guests drawn with animal faces. When he finds Ryszard, he chases him through the animal tunnels, catching him at gunpoint. Locking Antonina in a cage, he ignores her pleas as he drags the boy out of eyesight. When a shot rings out, she collapses in grief. A moment later, Heck walks back to his car, leaving the zoo for good. Ryszard returns to her side, unharmed. The two join the march out of Warsaw.

Warsaw began rebuilding four months after the Nazi surrender. Antonina and the children return to the damaged zoo, along with Jerzyk, their loyal zookeeper. Jan returns home, having survived a prison camp. They paint Stars of David on all the cages in the zoo.

In the postscript: the Żabińskis saved 300 Jews. Heck's zoo in Berlin was destroyed by Allied bombings, and he never recreated aurochs. The Żabińskis were recognized by Israel (Yad Vashem) for their righteous acts and defiance against the Germans. They rebuilt the present day Warsaw Zoo.

Cast

Historical context

The Zookeeper's Wife is based on Diane Ackerman's non-fiction book of the same name, which relied heavily on the diaries of Antonina Żabińska, published in Poland as Ludzie i zwierzęta (translated as: People and Animals) (1968). In key aspects of historical context, the screenplay follows the story of Antonina and her husband, Jan, closely. Both worked at the Warsaw Zoo. Antonina helped her husband who was the director of the zoo. Animals were part of their family's life, and the devastation that resulted from the attack on Warsaw and the subsequent pillaging of the zoo is well documented. The actions of Lutz Heck and his animal breeding experiments were also a matter of historical record, although the intimate relationship of the protagonist, Antonina, and the antagonist, Heck, is exaggerated. However, the defiance of Nazi occupation and ultimately, the rescue of over 300 Jews from the Warsaw Ghetto were depicted accurately. The contributions and participation of the Żabinski children, Ryszard and Teresa (credited as Theresa in the film) were also notable.

Production

Development
In September 2010, it was announced that Angela Workman was adapting Diane Ackerman's non-fiction book, The Zookeeper's Wife. On 30 April 2013, Jessica Chastain was attached to play the titular role as Antonina Żabińska, while Niki Caro signed on to direct the film. On 24 August 2015, Focus Features acquired the US rights to the film, and Daniel Brühl and Johan Heldenbergh signed on to star in it.

Filming
Filming began with the animals on 9 September 2015, and principal photography with the actors began on 29 September 2015, in Prague, Czech Republic. Suzie Davies served as the production designer, Andrij Parekh as the director of photography, and Bina Daigeler as the costume designer. Filming ended on 29 November 2015.

Release
The Zookeeper's Wife had its world premiere on 8 March 2017 in Warsaw, Poland, and its US premiere at the Cinequest Film Festival on 12 March 2017. The film was released in the United States on 31 March 2017 and was released in the United Kingdom on 21 April 2017. It premiered in Spain at the Barcelona-Sant Jordi International Film Festival on 22 April 2017. It also premiered in France at the 43rd Deauville Film Festival on 7 September 2017.

A special screening was held at the US Holocaust Museum in Washington DC on 22 March 2017, with a panel discussion including speakers Diane Ackerman, Jessica Chastain, Niki Caro and Angela Workman. Prior to the film's release, Focus Features partnered with the International Rescue Committee to screen the film in cities across the country, including a special screening at the Museum of Tolerance in Los Angeles, California, and a special screening in New York City, with a panel of speakers which included Chastain, Caro and Workman. The New York screening occurred on behalf of the Anne Frank Center for Mutual Respect, and was hosted by activist Steven Goldstein. The film speakers were joined by Sarah O'Hagan of the International Rescue Committee. The evening's topic of discussion was the rescue of Jewish refugees during the Holocaust, and the current refugee crisis in Europe.

The film began running on HBO on 23 December 2017.

Reception

Box office
The Zookeeper's Wife grossed $17.6 million in the United States and Canada and $8.6 million in other territories for a worldwide total of $26.1 million, against a production budget of $20 million.

In North America, the film grossed $3.3 million in its opening weekend from 541 theaters (a per-theater average of $6,191), finishing 10th at the box office. It remained the top grossing indie film in its second, third and fourth weeks of release.

The film remained the top grossing specialty film of 2017 in its fifth week of release, with IndieWire praising the film's release strategy, saying: "Focus’ aggressive push for this Jessica Chastain Holocaust rescue story has paid off with the top result for any specialized audience release since awards season. It won't hit the level of Woman in Gold two years ago ($33 million), but that's more of a factor of the steep decline in overall upscale grosses and more competition at the moment than other differences between the two films." In its eighth and ninth weeks of release, The Zookeeper's Wife was the third highest grossing specialty release of 2017, despite a reduction in its theater count. In its tenth week of release, IndieWire said the film "has been a rare specialized standout this spring."

The film remained the top-selling war film for the first three months of its home media release.

Critical response
On review aggregator Rotten Tomatoes, the film holds an approval rating of 64% based on 183 reviews. The website's critical consensus reads: "The Zookeeper's Wife has noble intentions, but is ultimately unable to bring its fact-based story to life with quite as much impact as it deserves." On Metacritic, the film has a weighted average score of 57 out of 100, based on 36 critics, indicating "mixed or average reviews". PostTrak reported that over 90% of audience members gave the film a rating of either "excellent" or "very good".

IndieWire listed The Zookeeper's Wife on its shortlist of best indie films of the year, stating: "Niki Caro’s fact-based historical drama is a heartbreaker of the highest order, anchored by an understated performance by Jessica Chastain and a series of wrenching dramatic twists that will wring tears out of even the hardest of hearts." Mick LaSalle, writing for The San Francisco Chronicle, gave the film a 5-star review, saying that it "grabs us from its first seconds" and that: The Zookeeper's Wife achieves its grandeur not through the depiction of grand movements, but through its attentiveness to the shifts and flickers of the soul. The war was a great external event, but Caro reminds us that it was experienced internally, by the people and the animals who had to try to live through it.Kenneth Turan, in the Los Angeles Times, says "Niki Caro and Jessica Chastain create an emotionally satisfying Zookeeper's Wife". The AP, the national wire service, says the film "tells a riveting true story" that is "both inspiring and comes as a welcome reminder in this time of uncertainty that even in the face of astonishing evil, humanity and goodness can also rise to the occasion." Jacob Soll in The New Republic heralded the film as the "first feminist Holocaust film".

In a negative review, Varietys Peter Debruge said, "There’s no nice way to put it in this case, but The Zookeeper’s Wife has the unfortunate failing of rendering its human drama less interesting than what happens to the animals — and for a subject as damaging to our species as the Holocaust, that no small shortcoming." In contrast, Varietys Kristopher Tapley wrote that the film deserved consideration as an Oscar contender.

Stephen Holden of The New York Times said the film "was like Schindler's List with pets," writing that it was "so timid and sanitized it almost feels safe for children."

Polish reviewers expressed a strong positive response to the film, which spoke to their history. The Krakow Post stated: "On a universal level (the film) is a prayer for sanity and the civilized values of charity, empathy, and humanity in any time which finds itself threatened to be ruled by mass insanity, hatred, and barbarism. Lessons derived from this darkest period of recent history can never be untimely."

Alexandra Macaaron, in Women's Voices For Change, gave the film a rave review, noting that The Zookeeper's Wife is a rarity among Holocaust films, and is distinguished by its female perspective on war and the struggle to protect every living soul, strangers and friends alike.

Accolades
At the 2016 Heartland Film Festival, held each October in Indianapolis, Indiana, The Zookeeper's Wife was awarded the "Truly Moving Picture Award"; emblematic of the festival's goal to "inspire filmmakers and audiences through the transformative power of film."

The Zookeeper's Wife was awarded the Audience Choice Award for Best Narrative Feature at the 2017 Seattle Jewish Film Festival.

In April 2017, Political Film Society USA nominated The Zookeeper's Wife for its PFS award, in the category "Human Rights".

See also 
 List of Holocaust films

Notes

References

Bibliography

 
 Heck, Lutz. Animals, My Adventure. London: Methuen, 1954. .

External links
 
 
 
The Zookeeper’s Wife: Fact vs. Fiction

2017 biographical drama films
2017 war drama films
2017 films
American biographical drama films
American war drama films
British biographical drama films
British war drama films
Czech war drama films
Drama films based on actual events
2010s feminist films
Films about animals
Films based on non-fiction books
Films directed by Niki Caro
Films scored by Harry Gregson-Williams
Films set in Poland
Films set in 1939
Films set in the 1940s
Films set in Warsaw
Films set in zoos
Films shot in the Czech Republic
Focus Features films
Jewish Polish history
Holocaust films
Rescue of Jews during the Holocaust
World War II films based on actual events
2017 drama films
American World War II films
Czech World War II films
British World War II films
2010s English-language films
2010s American films
2010s British films
English-language Czech films